This article lists terrorist incidents in Iraq in 2015.

Bombings and other atrocities were a daily event, as the country was in a state of war.

January 
 January 1: 15 members of the Jamilat tribe were executed after refusing to join ISIL.

February 
 February 7–9: Baghdad bombings

June 
 June 23: Suicide bombing kills two soldiers, injures 8 others in southwest of Ramadi
 June 27: ten people killed in a "routine" bombing.

July 
 July 17: Khan Bani Saad bombing

August 
 August 13: Baghdad bombing

October 
 October 3: At least 18 people were killed and more than 60 wounded in twin suicide bombings in Baghdad.

November 
 November 13: 26 people died as a result of a terrorist attack in Baghdad.

See also 
 List of terrorist incidents, 2015
 Terrorist incidents in Iraq in 2016
 Terrorist incidents in Iraq in 2014
 Terrorist incidents in Iraq in 2013
 List of bombings during the Iraq War

References 

 
2015 in Iraq
2015
Lists of terrorist incidents in 2015
2015 crimes in Iraq